The first USS Monticello was a wooden screw-steamer in the Union Navy during the American Civil War. She was named for the home of Thomas Jefferson. She was briefly named Star in May 1861.

Monticello was built at Mystic, Connecticut, in 1859; chartered by the Navy in May 1861; and purchased on 12 September 1861 at New York from H. P. Cromwell & Company, for service in the Atlantic Blockading Squadron, Captain Henry Eagle in command.

Service history 

Monticello was renamed Star on 3 May 1861, but resumed her original name on 23 May. Seeing immediate action, Monticello relieved  in blockading the James River and preventing communication with the Elizabeth River on 2 May, then relieved  at Cape Henry on the 8th. She engaged the batteries at Sewell's Point on May 18 and 19, then continued blockade duty until steaming up the Rappahannock to Smith's Island on 24 June. Operating with the Army on the James River above Newport News, Virginia on 5 July, she dispersed a body of Confederate cavalry. Often engaging Confederate batteries through the remainder of 1861, she was in the squadron that captured the batteries at Hatteras Inlet on 28–29 August in the first significant Union victory, one which greatly encouraged the North. She drove off Confederates attacking Union soldiers in that area on 5 October.

Departing Baltimore, Maryland on 25 March 1862 for the blockade of Wilmington, North Carolina, Monticello sent a boat party to the expedition up Little River on 26 June that destroyed two schooners. She engaged the batteries at New Inlet on 12 July, and took British schooner Revere off Wilmington on 11 October 1862. After relieving  on blockade at Shallow Inlet on 15 November, Monticello destroyed British schooners Ariel and Ann there the 24th.

Monticello operated around Little River through 1863, taking British schooner Sun on 30 March, and steamer Old Fellow on 15 April. In November, she destroyed salt works near Little River Inlet.

Returning to the Wilmington blockade in January 1864, she joined in the expedition to Smithville, North Carolina (now the town of Southport) on 29 February, capturing Captain Patrick Kelly of General Louis Hebert's staff. In July, she joined in the chase after , and on 24 August attacked Confederate batteries at Masonboro Inlet.

Monticello participated in the attacks on Fort Fisher on 24–25 December and on 13–14 January 1865. She took the surrender of Fort Casswell on 18–19 January, then participated in the Little River expedition of 4–6 February.

After the war, Monticello decommissioned on 24 July 1865 at Portsmouth, New Hampshire, and was sold at public auction at Boston, Massachusetts to W. H. Lincoln on 1 November. Redocumented for merchant service on 25 July 1866, she served American commerce until foundering off Newfoundland on 29 April 1872.

See also

Confederate States Navy

References

Steamships of the United States Navy
Ships built in Mystic, Connecticut
Ships of the Union Navy
American Civil War patrol vessels of the United States
1859 ships
Maritime incidents in April 1872
Shipwrecks in the Atlantic Ocean